Abroscelis anchoralis is a species of tiger beetle in the genus Abroscelis. Larvae live on beach microhabitats.

See also
Abroscelis

References

Cicindelidae
Beetles described in 1845
Beetles of Asia